WRM may refer to:

Wareham railway station in Dorset, England (National Rail station code)
Western Railway Museum in Sacramento, California.
W. Ross Macdonald School in Brantford, Ontario, Canada.
WRM Motors of Oxford, an aircraft manufacturing company in Oxford, England.
World Rainforest Movement, an environmentalist group based in Uruguay.
Wira Replacement Model, an early working title for the Proton Gen-2, a Malaysian car.
The White Rose Movement, a youth resistance group fighting Nazi Germany during World War II.
White Rose Movement, a British post-punk band.
Windows Rights Management (Services), a Digital rights management technology for Microsoft Windows.
Windows Remote Management, a Microsoft Windows implementation of WS-Management Protocol based on SOAP (Simple Object Access Protocol)